Metzneria asiatica is a moth of the family Gelechiidae. It was described by Piskunov in 1979. It is found in Central Asia.

References

Moths described in 1979
Metzneria